The Italian Catholic Diocese of Savona-Noli in northern Italy, was historically the Diocese of Savona, from the tenth century. In 1820 the Diocese of Noli was united to the Diocese of Savona. It is a suffragan of the Archdiocese of Genoa.

History

Bishops

Bernardus (992)
Joannes (999)
Ardeman (1014)
Antellinus (Ancellinus (1028)
Brixianus (1046)
Amicus (1049)
Giordano of Savona (1080)
Grossolanus (1098–1109)  (promoted to Milan)
Guglielmo (1110)
Ottaviano of Pavia (1119–1128)
Guido
Ambrosius

1200 to 1400
Albertus de Novara (1221–1230)   
Henricus (1230–ca. 1239)  
Bonifatius
Conradus de Ancisa
Rufinus Colombo (died September 1287)
Henricus de Ponzono (1289– ? )
Gregorius
Gualterius (1303)
Jacobus de Caradengo de Niella (attested 1305, 1311)
Federicus Cibo (1317–1342)
Gerardus de Vasconibus de Pergamo, O.E.S.A. (1342–1355)
Antonius Manfredi de Saluciis (1355–1376)  (promoted to Milan)
Dominicus de Lagneto (1376–1384)
Antonius de Viale (1386–1394) (appointed by Urban VI of the Roman Obedience)
Joannes Grimaldi (1394–1405)

1400 to 1600
Philippus Ogerii, O. Carm. (1405–1411)
Petrus Spinola, O.S.B. (1411–1413)
 ...
Giovanni Battista Cibò (1466–1472 Appointed, Bishop of Molfetta)
Giuliano della Rovere (1499–1502 Appointed, Administrator of Vercelli)
Galeotto della Rovere (1502–1504 Resigned)
Giacomo della Rovere (1504 Appointed – )
Raffaele Sansone Riario (1508–1516 Resigned)
Tommaso Giovanni Riario (1516–1528 Died)
Agostino Spínola, Administrator (1528–1537 Died)
Giacomo Fieschi (1537–1545 Died)
Niccolò Fieschi (bishop) (1546–1562 Resigned)
Giovanni Ambrosio Fieschi (1564–1576 Resigned)
Cesare Ferrero (1576–1581 Appointed, Bishop of Ivrea)
Domenico Grimaldi (1581–1584 Appointed, Bishop of Cavaillon)
Giovanni Battista Centurione (1584–1587 Resigned)
Pietro Francesco Costa (1587–1624 Resigned)

1600 to 1800
Francesco Maria Spinola, O.Theat. (1624–1664)
 ...
Stefano Spínola, C.R.S. (1664–1682 Died)
Vincenzo Maria Durazzo, C.R. (1683–1722 Died)
Agostino Spínola, C.R.S. (1722–1755 Died)
Ottavio Maria de Mari (15 December 1755 – 27 March 1776)
Dominico Maria Gentile (29 January 1776 – 20 September 1804)

since 1800
Vincenzo Maria Maggiolo (1804–1820)
Giuseppe Vincenzo Airenti, O.S.D. (1820–5 July 1830) (transferred to Genoa)
Agostino Maria Demari (1833–1840)
Alessandro Ottaviano Ricardi di Netro (1842–22 February 1867) (transferred to Turin)
Giovanni Battista Cerruti (22 February 1867–21 Mar 1879)
Giuseppe Boraggini (12 May 1879 – 30 April 1897)
Giuseppe Salvatore Scatti (15 February 1898 – 30 June 1926)
Pasquale Righetti (20 December 1926 – 7 July 1948)
Giovanni Battista Parodi (14 September 1948 – 15 Jul 1974)
Franco Sibilla (15 July 1974 – 8 September 1980)  (transferred to Asti)
Giulio Sanguineti (15 December 1980 – 7 December 1989)  (transferred to La Spezia-Sarzana-Brugnato)
Roberto Amadei (21 April 1990 – 21 November 1991)  (transferred to Bergamo)
Dante Lafranconi (7 December 1991 – 8 September 2001)  (transferred to Cremona)
Domenico Calcagno (25 January 2002 – 7 July 2007 transferred to Administration of the Patrimony of the Holy See)
Vittorio Lupi (30 November 2007 – )

Parishes
Of the 71 parishes 68 lie within the Province of Savona, Liguria. The remaining three are in the neighbouring commune of Cogoleto, Province of Genoa, also in Liguria.  In 2014 there was one Catholic priest for every 1,600 Catholics.

References

Books

Reference works
 p. 821-823. (Use with caution; obsolete)
  p. 433-434. (in Latin)
 p. 229.
 pp. 291–292.
 p. 305.
 p. 344.
 p. 367.

Studies

Kehr, Paul Fridolin,  Italia Pontificia,  Vol. VI: Liguria sive Provincia Mediolanensis (Berlin: Weidemann), pp. 353–357. (in Latin).

Savona-Noli
 
Province of Genoa
Province of Savona
Savona-Noli